Etz Chaim Yeshiva (Manhattan) was founded in 1886 on the Lower East Side of Manhattan, New York.  It was founded as a cheder-style elementary school  and, over time, became the basis of Yeshiva College and Yeshiva University.

See also 
 History of Yeshiva University

References 

Defunct schools in New York City
Jewish day schools in New York (state)
Educational institutions established in 1886
1886 establishments in New York (state)